Shamil Flayeh  (1 July 1940 – 30 November 2017) is a former Iraqi football midfielder who played for Iraq between 1962 and 1966. He played in the 1964 Arab Nations Cup and 1966 Arab Nations Cup.

On 30 November 2017, Flayeh died after a heart attack.

References

Iraqi footballers
Iraq international footballers
1940 births
2017 deaths
Association football midfielders